Khay or KHAY may refer to:

Khay (vizier), Vizier of Ramesses II
Khay (Nubian official), Egyptian official under king Tutankhamun
KHAY, a radio station in California
"Hi" (Ofra Haza song) or "Khay", the Israeli entry in the Eurovision Song Contest 1983